Ndu language may refer to:
 any language belonging to the Ndu languages of Papua New Guinea
 Ndo language, a language of Congo and Uganda